On 26 September 2022, a series of clandestine bombings and subsequent underwater gas leaks occurred on the Nord Stream 1 and Nord Stream 2 natural gas pipelines. Both pipelines were built to transport natural gas from Russia to Germany through the Baltic Sea, and are majority owned by the Russian majority state-owned gas company, Gazprom. The perpetrators' identities and the motives behind the sabotage remain debated.

Prior to the leaks, the pipelines had not been operating due to disputes between Russia and the European Union in the wake of the Russian invasion of Ukraine, but were filled with natural gas. On 26 September at 02:03 local time (CEST), an explosion was detected originating from Nord Stream 2; a pressure drop in the pipeline was reported and natural gas began escaping to the surface southeast of the Danish island of Bornholm. Seventeen hours later, the same occurred to Nord Stream 1, resulting in three separate leaks northeast of Bornholm. All three affected pipes were rendered inoperable; Russia has confirmed one of the two Nord Stream 2 pipes is operable and is thus ready to deliver gas through Nord Stream 2. The leaks occurred one day before Poland and Norway opened the Baltic Pipe running through Denmark, bringing in gas from the North Sea, rather than from Russia as the Nord Stream pipelines do. The leaks are located in international waters (not part of any nation's territorial sea), but within the economic zones of Denmark and Sweden.

Nord Stream AG, the Gazprom-owned operator of Nord Stream, said the pipelines had sustained "unprecedented" damage in one day. On 29 September, Russian President Vladimir Putin called the attack on the pipeline "an unprecedented act of international terrorism".

Background 

In 2021, Russia supplied roughly 45% of the natural gas imported by European Union states. The United States has been a major opponent of the Nord Stream pipelines. Former US President Donald Trump said in 2019 that Nord Stream 2 could turn Europe into a "hostage of Russia" and placed sanctions on any company assisting Russia to complete the pipeline. In December 2020, then President-elect Joe Biden came out forcefully against the opening of the new pipeline and the impact this would have on potential Russian influence. In 2021, the Biden administration lifted the sanctions, stating that while it was "unwavering" in opposition to Nord Stream 2, removing the sanctions was a matter of national interest, to maintain positive relations with Germany and other US allies in Europe. The second pipeline was completed in September 2021. On 7 February 2022, US President Joe Biden said in a press conference that the US "will end Nord Stream" if Russia invades Ukraine and reemphasised with a promise to do it when asked how.

Timeline 
The Geological Survey of Denmark said that a seismometer on Bornholm showed two spikes on 26 September: the first P wave at 02:03 local time (CEST) indicated a magnitude of 2.3 and the second at 19:03 a magnitude of 2.1. The seismic data were characteristic of underwater explosions, not natural events, and showed that they happened near the locations where the leaks were later discovered.

After Germany's initial report of pressure loss in Nord Stream 2, a gas leak from the pipeline was discovered by a Danish F-16 interceptor response unit to the southeast of Dueodde, Bornholm. Nord Stream 2 consists of two parallel lines and the leak happened in line A inside the Danish economic zone. The pipe, which was not operating, had  of pressurized gas in preparation for its first deliveries.

An environmental impact assessment of NS2 was made in 2019. By 2012, corrosion leaks had only occurred in two large pipelines worldwide. Leaks due to military-type acts and mishaps were considered "very unlikely". The largest leak in the analysis was defined as a "full-bore rupture (>)", for example from a sinking ship hitting the pipeline.

To weigh down the pipe (to ensure negative buoyancy), a  layer of concrete surrounds the steel. Each line of the pipeline was made of about 100,000 concrete-weight coated steel pipes each weighing  welded together and laid on the seabed.

Hours after the German office of Nord Stream AG had reported pressure loss in Nord Stream 1, two gas leaks were discovered on that pipeline by Swedish authorities. On 28 September, the Swedish Coast Guard clarified that the initially reported leak in the Swedish economic zone actually was two leaks located near each other, bringing the total number of leaks on the Nord Stream pipes to four (two in the Swedish economic zone, two in the Danish).

While none of the pipelines were delivering supplies to Europe, both Nord Stream 1 and 2 were pressurized with gas.

The SwePol power cable between Sweden and Poland passes near two of the leak sites, and was investigated for damage. Tests by Svenska Kraftnät, published on 4 October, indicated the cable was not damaged.

Swedish Navy ships were scouting for two days in nearby proximity where Nord Stream 1 and 2 were later subjected to sabotage. The search was carried out between Thursday and Saturday, but from the night of Sunday to Monday, no Swedish ships were at the site.

On 1 October, the Danish Energy Agency reported that one of the two pipelines, Nord Stream 2, appeared to have stopped leaking gas as the pressure inside the pipe had stabilized. The following day, the same agency reported that the pressure had stabilized in both Nord Stream 1 pipelines as well, indicating that the leakage had stopped. In contrast, Swedish authorities reported on 2 October that gas continues to escape from the two leaks in their economic zone, albeit to a lesser extent than a few days ago.

The leaks

Possibility of repairs 

On 27 September 2022, Nord Stream AG, the operator of Nord Stream, said it was impossible to estimate when the infrastructure would be repaired. German authorities stated that unless they were rapidly repaired, the three damaged lines, both lines in Nord Stream 1 and line A in Nord Stream 2, were unlikely to ever become operational again due to corrosion caused by sea water. The Washington Post reported that the incidents are likely to put a permanent end to both Nord Stream projects.

According to engineers, possible methods for the repair of the pipeline would include full-scale replacement of pipe segments and clamping of damaged sections. If carried out, repairs would be expected to last several months.

In February 2023, The Times reported that Russia had begun estimating repair costs, put at about $500 million.

Cause 
Sweden's Prime Minister Magdalena Andersson said that it likely was sabotage and also mentioned the detonations. The Geological Survey of Denmark said that the tremors that had been detected were unlike those recorded during earthquakes, but similar to those recorded during explosions. The Swedish public service broadcaster SVT reported that measuring stations in both Sweden and Denmark recorded strong underwater explosions near the Nord Stream pipelines. Björn Lund, Associate Professor in Seismology at The Swedish National Seismic Network said "there is no doubt that these were explosions" at an estimated  TNT equivalent. European Union officials blamed sabotage, as did the secretary general of NATO, Jens Stoltenberg, and the Prime Minister of Poland, Mateusz Morawiecki.

The Kremlin said that it did not rule out sabotage as a reason for the damage to the Nord Stream pipelines. Dmitry Peskov, the Kremlin spokesman, said: "We cannot rule out any possibility right now. Obviously, there is some sort of destruction of the pipe. Before the results of the investigation, it is impossible to rule out any option."

The German newspaper Der Tagesspiegel wrote that the leaks are being investigated for whether they may have been caused by targeted attacks by submarine or clearance divers.

On 11 November 2022, Wired reported that satellite imagery revealed two large unidentified ships which had turned off their AIS trackers and had appeared around the site of the leaks in the days before the gas leaks were detected.

On 18 November 2022, Swedish authorities announced that remains of explosives were found at the site of the leaks, and confirmed that the incident was the result of sabotage.

Investigations 
The day after the leaks occurred, the Swedish Police Authority opened an investigation of the incident, calling it "major sabotage". The investigation is conducted in cooperation with other relevant authorities as well as the Swedish Security Service. A similar investigation was opened in Denmark. The two nations were in close contact, and had also been in contact with other countries in the Baltic region and NATO. Because it happened within international waters (not part of any nation's territorial sea, although within the Danish and Swedish economic zones), neither the Danish Prime Minister nor the Swedish Prime Minister regarded it as an attack on their nation. On 2 October, Nancy Faeser, German Minister of the Interior and Community, announced that Germany, Denmark and Sweden intend to form a joint investigation team to investigate these seeming acts of sabotage.

Russia reportedly dispatched naval vessels to join Swedish and Danish maritime experts at the leak sites. Foreign Policy reported that since the pipelines are Russian-state owned and since the sabotage is not considered a military attack, investigations may be complicated by Russian involvement. Moscow demanded to be part of the investigations conducted by Denmark and Sweden, but both countries refused, telling Russia to conduct its own investigations.

On 6 October, the Swedish Security Service said its preliminary investigations in the Swedish exclusive economic zone showed extensive damage and they "found evidence of detonations", strengthening "the suspicions of serious sabotage".

On 10 October, the German Public Prosecutor General launched an investigation into suspected intentional causing of an explosion and anti-constitutional sabotage. The procedure is directed against unknown persons. According to the federal authority, it is responsible because it was a serious violent attack on national energy supply, likely to impair Germany's external and internal security. The Federal Criminal Police Office and the Federal Police were commissioned to investigate. The Federal Police had already started an investigative mission with assistance from the German Navy. This could only have been caused by explosives, it was said in government circles.

On 14 October, Russia's foreign ministry summoned German, Danish and Swedish envoys to express "bewilderment" over the exclusion of Russian experts from investigations and protesting reported participation of the United States, saying that Russia would not recognise any "pseudo-results" without the involvement of its own experts.

Also on 14 October, the Swedish prosecutor announced that Sweden would not set up a joint investigation team with Denmark and Germany because that would transfer information related to Swedish national security. German public broadcaster ARD also reported that Denmark had rejected a joint investigation team. On 18 November, the Swedish Security Service concluded that the incident was an act of "gross sabotage", stating that traces of explosives were found on the pipes. Also on 18 October, the Swedish newspaper Expressen released photos it had commissioned of the Nord Stream 1 damage, showing at least  of pipe missing from its trench, as well as steel debris around the site.

On 15 October, the left-wing German party Die Linke made a parliamentary inquiry to the government. The German government claimed that no on-site investigation had taken place yet, and refused to disclose information about the presence of NATO or Russian ships near Bornholm on the day of the presumed sabotage, citing state secret.

In February 2023, The Times stated that none of the three separate investigations had publicly assigned responsibility for the damage.

On 17 February 2023, Russia formally submitted a proposal to the Security Council of the United Nations calling for an investigation into the Nord Stream sabotage, and reiterated its request on 20 February 2023.

According to a European lawmaker briefed late last year by his country's main foreign intelligence service, investigators have been gathering information about an estimated 45 "ghost ships" whose location transponders were not on or were not working when they passed through the area, possibly to cloak their movements. The lawmaker was also told that more than 1,000 pounds of "military grade" explosives were used by the perpetrators.

Speculation 
Russia first accused the United Kingdom, and later the United States, of being responsible for the sabotage.

Involvement by Russia 
CNN reported that European security officials observed Russian Navy support ships nearby where the leaks later occurred on 26 and 27 September. One week prior, Russian submarines were also observed nearby.

In September 2022, the former head of Germany's Federal Intelligence Service (BND), Gerhard Schindler, alleged that Russia sabotaged the gas pipelines to justify their halting of gas supplies prior to the explosion and said Russia's "halt in gas supplies can now be justified simply by pointing to the defective pipelines, without having to advance alleged turbine problems or other unconvincing arguments for breaking supply contracts.”

Finland's national public broadcasting company Yle compared the incident to the two explosions on a gas pipeline in North Ossetia in January 2006, which were caused by remote-controlled military-grade charges. The explosions halted Russian gas supply to Georgia after the country had started seeking NATO membership.

In December 2022, The Washington Post reported that after months of investigation, there was so far no conclusive evidence that Russia was behind the attack, and numerous European and US officials privately say that Russia may not be to blame after all. Others who still consider Russia a prime suspect said positively attributing the attack — to any country — may be impossible.

Involvement by the United States 

Der Spiegel reported that the United States Central Intelligence Agency had warned the German government of possible sabotage to the pipelines weeks beforehand. The New York Times reported that the CIA had warned various European governments sometime in June.

In a widely shared post on Twitter, Polish MEP and former foreign affairs and defence minister Radek Sikorski stated simply, "Thank you, USA", next to a photo of bubbling water above the pipeline damage. He followed up to clarify that this was only speculation on his part, and that his view was based in part on a February joint press conference of US President Joe Biden and German Chancellor Olaf Scholz, during which Biden stated, "If Russia invades ... again, there will no longer be a Nord Stream 2. We will bring an end to it." Sikorski's post was criticized by many politicians and government officials. Polish government spokesman Piotr Müller said it was harmful and served Russian propaganda. US State Department spokesman Ned Price characterized the idea of US involvement in the pipeline damage as "preposterous". Der Spiegel commented that Nord Stream 2 was already stopped entirely without explosives two days before Russia invaded Ukraine, and that what happened is exactly what Biden and Scholz had said would happen. Sikorski deleted the original and all follow-up tweets several days later.

At a United Nations Security Council meeting convened for the incident, Russian Federation representative Vasily Nebenzya suggested that the United States was involved in the pipeline damage. Deutsche Welle fact check concluded that the Russian claim "that an American helicopter was responsible for the gas leaks is untenable and misleading." The helicopter never flew along the pipeline and the gas leak areas were at least 9 and 30 km away, respectively, from its flight path.

On 2 February 2023, Russian foreign minister Sergei Lavrov said on Russian state television the U.S. had direct involvement in the explosions intended to help preserve U.S. global dominance.

On 8 February 2023, American investigative journalist Seymour Hersh published an article on his Substack page in which he alleged that the attack was ordered by the White House and carried out utilizing American and Norwegian assets. The post relied on a single anonymous source, whom Hersh described as having "direct knowledge of the operational planning." The White House responded to the story by calling it "utterly false and complete fiction". Norwegian Ministry of Foreign Affairs said that those allegations are "nonsense". Russian Deputy Foreign Minister Sergei Ryabkov told Russian state-owned media RIA Novosti that "Our assumption was that the US and several NATO allies were involved in this disgusting crime." He also threatened unspecified "consequences" for the US. Norwegian commentator  challenged the accuracy of Hersh's claims, such as the notion that Alta-class minesweepers had participated in BALTOPS 2022, or that NATO Secretary General Jens Stoltenberg had been cooperating with U.S. intelligence since the Vietnam War, when he was a teenager and fervently opposed to NATO.

Involvement by other countries 
On 29 October 2022, Russia accused a unit of the United Kingdom's Royal Navy of sabotaging the gas pipeline. This claim was denied by the UK Ministry of Defence which released a statement saying: "To detract from their disastrous handling of the illegal invasion of Ukraine, the Russian Ministry of Defence is resorting to peddling false claims of an epic scale".

In late 2022, another former head of the BND, August Hanning, said that Russia, Ukraine, Poland and Britain had a plausible interest in disabling the pipelines, as well as the U.S.

In March 2023, several international media outlets, citing anonymous sources, reported that a pro-Ukrainian group may have carried out the attack. According to these reports, investigators found explosive residues in a yacht that had been rented by six people with professionally forged passports, for a Polish company with two Ukrainian owners. The yacht is said have left Rostock on 6 September.

Aftermath 
On 27 September 2022, European gas prices jumped 12 percent after news spread of the damaged pipelines, despite the fact that Nord Stream 1 had not delivered gas since August and Nord Stream 2 had never gone into service.

The Danish Navy and Swedish Coast Guard sent ships to monitor the discharge and keep other vessels away from danger by establishing an exclusion zone of  around each leak. Two of the ships are the Swedish  and the Danish Absalon, which are specially designed to operate in contaminated environments such as gas clouds. Vessels could lose buoyancy if they enter the gas plumes, and there might be a risk of leaked gas igniting over the water and in the air, but there were no risks associated with the leaks outside the exclusion zones.

The president of the European Commission, Ursula von der Leyen, wrote on Twitter that "Any deliberate disruption of active European energy infrastructure is unacceptable & will lead to the strongest possible response." After the leaks, Norwegian authorities increased the security around their gas and oil infrastructure. , eastward flow of gas from Germany to Poland through the Yamal–Europe pipeline was stable, as was transmission through Ukraine , although concerns remained that Russia may introduce "sanctions against Ukraine's Naftogaz [...] that could prohibit Gazprom from paying Ukraine transit fees [... that] could end Russian gas flows to Europe via the country."

On 5 October, Nord Stream 2 AG reported that Gazprom had begun pulling gas back out of the undamaged pipe for consumption in Saint Petersburg, reducing pipe pressure. Infrastructure in the North Sea was being inspected for anomalies.

On 11 January 2023, EU and NATO announced the creation of a task force on making their critical infrastructure more resilient to potential threats, citing "Putin’s weaponising of energy" and the sabotage of the Nord Stream pipelines.

Environmental impact 

In the area, the leaks would only affect the environment where the gas plumes in the water column are located. A greater effect is likely to be the climate impact caused by the large volumes of escaping methane, a potent greenhouse gas. The released volume is approximately 0.25% of the annual capacity of the pipelines, an amount nearly equal to the total release from all other sources of methane in a full year across Sweden.

The methane emissions from the leaks are equal to a few days of the emissions from regular fossil fuel production. However, the leaks set a record as the single largest discharge of methane, dwarfing all previously known leaks, such as the Aliso Canyon gas leak.

Equipment measured no increase in atmospheric methane at Bornholm. A weather station in Norway logged an unprecedented 400 parts per billion (ppb) increase from a base level of 1800 ppb.

Scientists from several European countries have analyzed the impact on marine ecosystems. The shockwave is stated to have killed marine life within a radius of 4 kilometer and have damaged the hearing of animals up to 50 kilometers. An estimated 250,000 metric tons of seafloor sediment containing lead and tributyltin used in anti-fouling paint have been lifted up. Additionally, the area is contaminated from the dumping of ammunitions and chemical weapons.

See also
2022 Urengoy–Pomary–Uzhhorod pipeline explosion

References 

2022 disasters in Europe
2022 industrial disasters
2022 controversies
2022 in Sweden
September 2022 events in Denmark
September 2022 crimes in Europe
Events affected by the 2022 Russian invasion of Ukraine
Pipeline accidents
Gas explosions
Unsolved crimes in Europe
Russia–European Union relations
Bornholm
History of the Baltic Sea
Scholz cabinet